Milroy McCune (July 4, 1883 – October 1, 1936) was an American Negro league third baseman between 1909 and 1911.

A native of Waxahachie, Texas, McCune played three seasons with the Minneapolis Keystones from 1909 to 1911. He died in Fort Worth, Texas in 1936 at age 53.

References

External links
Baseball statistics and player information from Baseball-Reference Black Baseball Stats and Seamheads

1883 births
1936 deaths
Minneapolis Keystones players
Baseball third basemen
Baseball players from Texas
People from Waxahachie, Texas
20th-century African-American people